Davos Frauenkirch railway station is a railway station in the municipality of Davos, in the Swiss canton of Graubünden. It is located on the Davos Platz–Filisur line. An hourly service operates on this line.

Services
The following services stop at Davos Glaris:

References

External links
 
 
 

Railway stations in Switzerland opened in 1909
Davos
Railway stations in Graubünden
Rhaetian Railway stations